Tigrosa georgicola is a species of wolf spider in the family Lycosidae. It is endemic to the Southeastern United States. The type specimen was collected in Burke County, Georgia. Its habitat includes the forest floor of deciduous woodlands.

References

Lycosidae
Spiders of the United States
Spiders described in 1837